Assab Subregion is a district in the Southern Red Sea region of Eritrea.

References
Assab City

Southern Red Sea Region
Subregions of Eritrea